Radio Cazin is a Bosnian local public radio station, broadcasting from Cazin, Bosnia and Herzegovina.

Radio Cazin was launched on 2 September 1975 by the municipal council of Cazin. In Yugoslavia and in SR Bosnia and Herzegovina, it was part of local/municipal Radio Sarajevo network affiliate. This radio station broadcasts a variety of programs such as music, sport, local news and talk shows. Program is mainly produced in Bosnian language.

Estimated number of potential listeners of Radio Cazin is around 57,793.

Due to the favorable geographical position in Bosanska Krajina area, this radiostation is also available in municipalities: Bihać, Bužim, Bosanska Krupa, Velika Kladuša, Prijedor and in a part of the Lika-Senj County in neighboring Croatia. Radio Cazin is also available via IPTV platform Moja TV on channel 191.

RTV C, a television service, was established in 1993 and is also part of public municipality services.

Frequencies
The program is currently broadcast on 2 frequencies:

 Cazin 
 Cazin

See also 
List of radio stations in Bosnia and Herzegovina

References

External links 
 www.rtvcazin.ba
 Communications Regulatory Agency of Bosnia and Herzegovina

Cazin
Una-Sana Canton
Radio stations established in 1975